Chen Min'er (born 29 September 1960) is a Chinese politician and a member of the Politburo of the Chinese Communist Party who is serving as the Communist Party Secretary of Tianjin. From 2017 to 2022, he served as the Communist Party Secretary of Chongqing and a member of the 19th Politburo of the Chinese Communist Party. Chen spent most of his career in his native Zhejiang province, serving as head of the provincial department of media, and Vice Governor of Zhejiang. In 2013, he was transferred to Guizhou as governor, and in 2015 promoted to provincial Communist Party Secretary. Chen was catapulted to prominence in 2017 in the aftermath of the ouster of Chongqing party secretary Sun Zhengcai, a move that made him well-positioned for further elevation.

Career

Zhejiang
Chen was born in September 1960 in Zhuji, Zhejiang. From 1978 to 1981 Chen Min'er studied Chinese at Shaoxing Teacher's College (later merged into Shaoxing University) in Zhejiang.  After college he worked in the Shaoxing government, rising through the ranks to become the county governor of Shaoxing County in 1991, and Communist Party Secretary (the top position in the county) in 1994.  In 1997 Chen was transferred to the neighbouring city of Ningbo to become its Vice Mayor.  In 1999 he was promoted to deputy party secretary Ningbo.

In December 1999 Chen was appointed the chief editor of Zhejiang Daily, the official government newspaper of Zhejiang province, and in 2001 he became the Propaganda Chief of the Zhejiang Communist Party organization.  In June 2002, Chen, then 42, earned a seat on the provincial Party Standing Committee.  From May 2007 to January 2012 he was a Vice Governor of Zhejiang. During this period he worked under Zhejiang party secretary Xi Jinping.

Guizhou
In January 2012, Chen was transferred to the southwestern interior province of Guizhou to become its Deputy Party Secretary, and in December he was appointed Acting Governor of Guizhou, succeeding Zhao Kezhi, who had been promoted to Communist Party Secretary.  In January 2013 he was officially confirmed as governor by the Guizhou Provincial Congress.

In July 2015, Chen was promoted to Party Secretary of Guizhou, becoming only the fourth provincial party-level secretary born after the year 1960 (after Hu Chunhua, Zhou Qiang, and Sun Zhengcai). Due to the Communist Party's rigid age-based promotion system, it led to speculation that Chen may be destined for higher office. After taking charge as party secretary, Chen enthusiastically advanced the policies of CCP General secretary Xi Jinping, such as the "Three Stricts and Three Honests" education campaign. Chen also led an initiative to set up formal discussions (yuetan) over alleged wrongdoing by officials in the province, personally taking charge of the most serious cases. In an interview with the media organs of the Central Commission for Discipline Inspection, Chen repeated the slogan "power must be restricted in the cage of institutions, and power should be exercised in sunshine," (i.e., transparently and openly). Chen set up over 1,400 working committees in neighbourhoods and rural areas in the province to oversee complaints over routine government services.

In Guizhou, Chen instituted a program of poverty reduction and invested heavily in making Guizhou a center of innovation for big data.

Chongqing
In July 2017, Chen was appointed as the Communist Party Secretary of Chongqing municipality, replacing Sun Zhengcai. As Chen assumed leadership over one of the four direct-controlled municipalities, the move assured him a seat in the CCP Politburo (decision-making body) at the 19th CCP Party Congress.

Chen was an alternate member of the 17th Central Committee and a full member of the 18th Central Committee of the Chinese Communist Party. Chen has been portrayed by overseas media as an associate of CCP leader Xi Jinping, and has been named as part of the "New Zhijiang Army".

References 

Living people
1960 births
Governors of Guizhou
Political office-holders in Zhejiang
Chinese Communist Party politicians from Zhejiang
People's Republic of China politicians from Zhejiang
Politicians from Shaoxing
Members of the 20th Politburo of the Chinese Communist Party
Members of the 19th Politburo of the Chinese Communist Party
Alternate members of the 17th Central Committee of the Chinese Communist Party
Members of the 18th Central Committee of the Chinese Communist Party